Eildon is a town in central Victoria, Australia.  It is located near Lake Eildon, on the Goulburn Valley Highway, in the Shire of Murrindindi local government area. At the 2016 census, Eildon had a population of 974.

Taungurung people are the traditional owners of the land around Eildon (which stretches north-east beyond Mansfield, Victoria and to the west nearly to Bendigo). Taungurung country is part of the Kulin nation.

The name Eildon was given to the township by some of the first white settlers in the area, Mr and Mrs Archibald Thom in 1846, and was so named for its similarities to Mrs Thom's birthplace in the Eildon Hills near Abottsford in Scotland.

History

Eildon as a township came about due to the construction of the Sugarloaf Reservoir. The township of Darlingford (which was located near the junction of Big River and the Goulburn River) was established in the 1860s, when gold was discovered nearby, however when the construction of the reservoir commenced in 1915, which would ultimately flood the land behind the dam wall, including the township of Darlingford and Eildon Station (a run of 25,000 hectares owned by the Thoms). The town of Darlingford was moved closer to where the current township is now located. The Sugarloaf Dam was completed in 1929, and the original town of Darlingford is now completely underwater.

Workers were brought into the town by the State Rivers and Water Supply Commission to work on the building of the reservoir, and the shanty town called Eildon began to develop. Many lived in tents. 

The original Sugarloaf Dam could only hold around 10% of the capacity of the current dam, and so construction of the Eildon Dam commenced in 1951 and was completed by 1956 to increase the size and capacity of the lake. The Sugarloaf Reservoir Dam Wall sits about 100 metres behind the current dam wall, and is visible when the water level drops very low. 

Around 4,000 workers were required to complete the 1950s construction, and these workers were brought in, but required housing. The new township of Eildon relocated to the present position, and comprises a series of 300 semi-permanent houses in 14 different styles. Materials for the houses were pre-cut and fabricated in England and assembled onsite. Temporary houses and hostels were built to accommodate more workers. If you drive around Eildon today, you will see many houses are still the original pre-fabricated houses erected for workers in the 1950s.

A Post Office named Eildon opened on 14 November 1890 and closed in 1893. Later a Post Office named Eildon Weir opened on 23 August 1915 and was renamed Eildon in about 1950.

Climate

Lake Eildon is most notable for its extraordinary cloud cover in winter (measuring only 69.0 sunshine hours in June); this is especially cloudy for a location at 37 degrees south.

Recreation

Lake Eildon, which sits to the north-east of the township, is used for water sports, including skiing, wakeboarding, kayaking, canoeing, and camping and fishing. 

Together with its neighbouring township Thornton, Eildon used to have an Australian Rules football team (Thornton-Eildon) competing in the Yarra Valley Mountain District Football League.

Golfers play at the course of the Eildon Golf Club on Jamieson Road.

There are plenty of hiking and mountain bike trails around the town and Lake Eildon that offer excellent views of the lake and surrounding mountains.

Fishing 
Lake Eildon is a scenic destination for avid fisherpeople, and some of the more common species of fish found in the lake includes Redfin, Murray Cod, Carp and Golden Perch. The lake benefits from the Snobs Creek Fish Hatchery Native Fish Stocking program, which in 2020 restocked the lake with more than 500,000 Murray Cod and more than 200,000 Golden Perch.

Points of interest 
 Eildon Trout Farm - This trout farm is located on the banks of the Goulburn River.
 Snobs Creek Falls - Snobs Creek Falls (also known as just Snobs Falls) is a reliably flowing waterfall. The falls have a drop of 100m.
 Foggs Lookout - Also known as Mount Pinninger Lookout, is a short drive from town and offers a wonderful vantage point to view the lake, dam wall, and McDonald Island.

See also
 Lake Eildon National Park

References

External links

Australian Places - Eildon

Towns in Victoria (Australia)
Shire of Murrindindi